The 1993 Southeast Asian Games, officially known as the 17th Southeast Asian Games were held in Singapore from 12 to 19 June 1993 with 29 sports in 440 events featured in this edition. This was the third time Singapore hosted the games after 1983 and 1973 competition. It was opened by President Wee Kim Wee. The Games featured 29 sports in 440 events. The final medal tally was led by Indonesia.

Marketing

Logo

The logo of the 1993 Southeast Asian Games is an image of a lion, which represents Singapore with the nickname, the lion city as the host of the 1993 Southeast Asian Games. The colours of the lion, blue, yellow, red, black and green are colours of the Olympic movement and represents the Olympic and sportsmanship spirit of the participating athletes in which the important thing is not to win, but to take part. The six-ring chain, the logo of the Southeast Asian Games Federation, represents the six founding nations of the Southeast Asian Games and the Southeast Asian Games itself.

Mascot
The mascot of the 1993 Southeast Asian Games is a lion named, Singa. It has heart-shaped mane, snout and tail which represent the hearty welcome of athletes to the city.

Torch
The torch of the 1993 Southeast Asian games resembles that of a sword mounted with a lion's head.

The Games

Opening ceremony 
The official opening ceremony was held at 20:00 Singapore Standard Time (UTC+8) on 12 June 1993 in the Singapore National Stadium which was attended by the President of Singapore Wee Kim Wee and was live telecast on SBC-12.

The opening ceremony begin with a countdown called as "Countdown" from 20 to 1 all countdown clock at the SEA Games sports screen from 10 to 1 voice: Twenty, Nineteen, Eighteen, Seventeen, Sixteen, Fifteen, Fourteen, Thirteen, Twelve, Eleven, 10 (Ten), 9 (Nine), 8 (Eight), 7 (Seven), 6 (Six), 5 (Five), 4 (Four), 3 (Three), 2 (Two), 1 (One) and officially launched the logo of 1993 Singapore SEA Games with the first segment "Welcome to Lion City" a song written by Singapore Symphony Orchestra. Volunteers held large, five-foot balloons, each with a ribbon banner attached with the word "Selamat Datang" (Malay), "欢迎" (Mandarin), "வரவேற்பு" (Tamil) and "Welcome to Lion City" (English) written in all four languages.

The national anthem of Singapore, Majulah Singapura, was then performed by the Singapore Symphony Orchestra, led by conductor, Lim Soon Lee. Performers on the field used placards to form the words, Majulah Singapura.

The Parade of nations started with Brunei, followed by Indonesia, Laos, Malaysia, Myanmar, Philippines, Thailand, Vietnam and Singapore last as host nation.

Dr Yeo Ning Hong, President of the SEA Games Federation, gave an opening speech which was followed by President of Singapore Wee Kim Wee announcing the official opening of the Southeast Asian Games.

The SEA Games Federation flag was carried into the stadium by eight Singapore athletes. The flag was then raised with the SEA Games anthem playing. The torch with the SEA Games flame entered the stadium and was passed to Ng Xuan Hui, Singapore's Sportgirl of the year. She then handed the touch over to Tan Wearn Haw, who passed it to Benedict Tan. Tan passed the torch to bowler, Grace Young, who ran the last 100 meters to a cannon. She lit the cannon with the SEA Games flame which "shot" a "projectile" towards the SEA Games Cauldron which was then lit by the "projectile".

Swimmer Ang Peng Siong and Singapore Amateur Swimming Association secretary Woon Sui Kut took the Games pledges on behalf of the athletes and officials.

Various artistes from the participating countries performed on stage.

The opening ceremony concluded with the exit of President of Singapore, Wee Kim Wee.

Closing ceremony 
The official closing ceremony was held at 20:00 Singapore Standard Time (UTC+8) on 20 June 1993 in the Singapore National Stadium which was attended by the President of Singapore Wee Kim Wee and was live telecast on SBC-12.
The closing ceremony begin with playing of the national anthem of Singapore, Majulah Singapura, by the Singapore Symphony Orchestra
Flag bearers and athletes of participating countries enter the stadium.
Gymnasts and performers carrying multicoloured vertical flags enter.
President of Singapore Wee Kim Wee delivered closing speeches for the games and declared the games closed.
The SEA Games Federation flag was lowered and exited the stadium.
After the exit of the flag, there was a firework display and the sta
After the f the SEA Games flame of a "all light off" to afer exit of the SEA Games Federation Flag and all full fireworks displays.
In a handover ceremony, the Minister for Defence, Yeo Ning Hong, presented the SEA Games Federation Flag to the Mayor of Chiang Mai, the host city of the next SEA Games and the Thailand national flag was raised to the playing of Thailand national anthem.
The ceremony concluded with Tiffany Darwish performing 10 songs. At the end of the performance, there was a final fireworks display around the Singapore National Stadium grounds.
The closing ceremony ended at 20:30 SST.

Participating nations

 
 
 
 
 
 
 (Host)

Sports

Medal table
A total of 1048 medals, comprising 319 Gold medals, 318 Silver medals and 411 Bronze medals were awarded to athletes. The host Singapore's performance was their best to date and placed fourth overall amongst participating nations.

Broadcasting

Main sponsors
Coca-Cola
Gatorade
Seiko
Konica
Toyota
Yonex
Opel
National
Panasonic
Nike
Samsung
Mikasa
Singapore Telecom
Singapore Airlines
Singapore Post
Singapore Press Holdings
Singapore Broadcasting Corporation (broadcast rights by SBC-12)
Nestle Milo

References

External links
 Singapore hosts the 17th SEA Games
 Looking Back at SEA Games Singapore 
 Medal Tally 1959-1995
 Medal Tally
 History of the SEA Games
 OCA SEA Games
 SEA Games previous medal table
 SEAGF Office  
 SEA Games members

 
Southeast Asian Games
1993 in multi-sport events
Southeast Asian Games
Southeast Asian Games
Multi-sport events in Singapore
Southeast Asian Games